Owais Ahmed Rana (10 July 1988) is a 2014  batch IAS officer of Jammu and Kashmir cadre. He is serving as the Deputy Commissioner / District Magistrate of Bandipore in North Kashmir region of J&K Union Territory.

He also served as the Deputy Commissioner / District Magistrate of Shopian District of Jammu and Kashmir.
Prior to this, he was the chief executive officer of  Jammu & Kashmir Energy Development Agency (JAKEDA), Department of Science & Technology, working under Government of Jammu and Kashmir.
He also worked as managing director, JK State Road Transport Corporation.

Early life and education 
Owais Ahmed Rana was born in Kalaban village of Poonch on 10 July 1988. He did his early schooling from Delhi Public School, Jammu and from Khuda Bakash Public School, Gujjar Desh Charitable Trust  Jammu. Later joined Sher-e-Kashmir University of Agricultural Sciences and Technology of Kashmir and did bachelor's degree in  Veterinary Science from there. In 2012 he joined Kashmir Administrative Services and serves on different positions. In 2014 he joined IAS, later he got Jammu and Kashmir Cadre.
From 2014 to till date served as, Sub Divisional Magistrate  Marh, Jammu, Assistant Secretary, Ministry of Urban Development, Govt of India., Sub Divisional Magistrate, Bhadarwah, Sub Divisional Magistrate. Karnah-Tangdar, Additional Secretary, Finance Department, Deputy Commissioner Shopiyan, and also served as chief executive officer of  Jammu & Kashmir Energy Development Agency (JAKEDA), Department of Science & Technology. He is nephew of a prominent educator, social reformer, thinker and  former Vice Chancellor of BGSB University Rajouri  Dr  Masud Choudhary.

References 

Living people
People from Jammu and Kashmir
Indian Administrative Service officers
1988 births